Rudolfus 'Ruud' Hubertus Hesp (born 31 October 1965) is a Dutch former professional footballer who played as a goalkeeper.

Club career
Born in Bussum, North Holland, Hesp started his career in the 1985–86 season at HFC Haarlem. He was recommended to Haarlem by Piet Schrijvers, who had coached him in FC Abcoude. Despite rarely playing in his two years for Haarlem, he moved along with coach Hans van Doorneveld to another club in the Eredivisie, Fortuna Sittard, where he would remain the following seven years; during his first ten professional campaigns (one with Fortuna was spent in the second division), he did not miss a single game.

After three seasons with Roda JC, Hesp signed with Spanish side FC Barcelona as the Catalans were being managed by countryman Louis van Gaal, also newly signed. Van Gaal resorted to Hesp after he was able to sign neither Edwin van der Sar, who stayed at Ajax, nor Ed de Goey, who signed for Chelsea. He easily beat competition from Portuguese Vítor Baía, playing in 73 out of 76 possible La Liga matches as Barça won back-to-back leagues (in 1998, the double befell).

In his last season at the Camp Nou, Hesp split first-choice status with youth graduate Francesc Arnau, then moved back to the Netherlands and Fortuna, retiring at almost 37 in 2002. Subsequently, he joined FC Groningen as a goalkeeper coach.

In the summer of 2013, Hesp left Groningen for PSV Eindhoven in the same capacity.

International career
Although Hesp was picked by the Netherlands for their UEFA Euro 1996 and 1998 FIFA World Cup squads, he never actually won a cap for the national team, acting as understudy to both first-choice Edwin van der Sar and his substitute Ed de Goey. He also worked with the side as a goalkeeper coach.

Personal life
Hesp's younger brother, Danny, was also a professional footballer. A defender, the pair shared teams in 1994–95 at Roda.

Honours
Roda JC
KNVB Cup: 1996–97

Barcelona
La Liga: 1997–98, 1998–99
Copa del Rey: 1997–98
UEFA Super Cup: 1997

References

External links
Beijen profile 
Roda archives 

1965 births
Living people
People from Bussum
Dutch footballers
Association football goalkeepers
Eredivisie players
Eerste Divisie players
HFC Haarlem players
Fortuna Sittard players
Roda JC Kerkrade players
La Liga players
FC Barcelona players
1998 FIFA World Cup players
UEFA Euro 1996 players
Dutch expatriate footballers
Expatriate footballers in Spain
Dutch expatriate sportspeople in Spain
PSV Eindhoven non-playing staff
FC Groningen non-playing staff
Footballers from North Holland